The men's individual compound competition in archery at the 2021 Islamic Solidarity Games will held from 15 to 18 August at the Saraçoğlu Sport Complex  in Konya.

Qualification round
Results after 72 arrows.

Final round

Elimination round
Source:

Top half

Bottom half

References

Men's individual compound